was an anime director for Sunrise who was known for directing Vifam, The Ultraman anime, Kiko Senki Dragonar and the first six episodes of Mobile Suit Gundam: The 08th MS Team. He was also heavily inspired by Nicolas Roeg, Stanley Kubrick and Steven Spielberg on his works. On July 27, 1996 while making his first directed Gundam series, Takeyuki Kanda was reportedly killed in a car crash. Many claimed that he was drunk while driving on his way to his home and many of his animators said he had a drinking problem. Due to his death, he was replaced by Umanosuke Iida for the final episodes of Gundam: The 08th MS Team. The final episode of The 08th MS Team, the movie Miller's Report and the first episode of Ginga Hyōryū Vifam 13 were all dedicated in his loving memory.

Works as a director 
 The Adventures of the Little Prince (1978) (co-directed with Kôji Yamazaki)
 The Ultraman (1979) (co-directed with Hisayuki Toriumi)
 Uchū Taitei God Sigma (1980) (directed episodes 1-10)
 Fang of the Sun Dougram (1981) (co-directed with Ryousuke Takahashi)
 Doraemon: What Am I for Momotaro (1981)
 Shiroi Kiba White Fang Monogatari (1982) (co-directed with Soji Yoshikawa)
 Ginga Hyōryū Vifam (1983)
 Ginga Hyōryū Vifam: Kachua Kara no Tayori (1984)
 Ginga Hyōryū Vifam: Atsumatta 13-nin (1984)
 Choriki Robo Galatt (1984)
 Ginga Hyōryū Vifam: Kieta 12-nin (1985)
 Ginga Hyōryū Vifam: "Kate no Kioku" Namida no Dakkai Sakusen!! (1985)
 Metal Armor Dragonar (1987)
 Armor Hunter Mellowlink (1988)
 Blue Sonnet (1989)
 Dragon Warrior (Dragon Quest: Legend of the Hero Abel) (1989) (co-directed with Katsuhisa Yamada and Rintaro)
 SD Gundam The Movie: Musha Knight Command (1991)
 Tanoshii Moomin Ikka: Bōken Nikki (1991)
 Konpeki no Kantai (1993) (replaced by Hiromichi Matano in late 1995 when going to do The 08th MS Team)
 Mobile Suit Gundam: The 08th MS Team (1996) (directed the first six episodes and was replaced by Umanosuke Iida after his death)

External links 
 
 

Sunrise (company) people
1943 births
1996 deaths
Anime directors
Road incident deaths in Japan
Accidental deaths in Japan